Olga Kaljakin (November 8, 1950 – October 6, 2008) was an American art director, graphic designer and film poster artist.

Biography
Kaljakin began her career in advertising by joining Petersen Publishing. She later became an art director and graphic designer for Seiniger Advertising, Aspect Ratio and Crew Creative. During her career, Kaljakin received numerous awards and honors for her work, much of which focused on motion picture advertising via film posters, billboards and newspaper ads.  Her awards include Hollywood Reporter Key Art Awards and Art Directors Club of LA certificates.

Kaljakin designed film posters and advertising over the course of twenty-five years. She designed the posters for The Last Samurai, Field of Dreams, Moonstruck, The Untouchables, and numerous other films.  The bulk of her film advertising work fell within the timeframe of 1985–1997.

Kaljakin died of emphysema on October 6, 2008, at the age of 57. Her memorial service and burial was held at Hollywood Forever Cemetery. Kaljakin was survived by her children, Tania Kaljakin Hernandez and Alexander Aquino Kaljakin, and her mother, Maria Kaljakin.

Her archives are held at the Motion Picture Academy.

References

American art directors
Film poster artists
American graphic designers
Women graphic designers
1950 births
2008 deaths
Burials at Hollywood Forever Cemetery
Deaths from emphysema
American people of Russian descent